Wu Hong-mo is a Taiwanese politician.

Early life
Wu obtained his bachelor's degree in civil engineering from Feng Chia University in 1976, master's degree in safety, health and environmental engineering from National Kaohsiung First University of Science and Technology in 2002, and doctoral degree in marine environment and engineering from National Sun Yat-sen University (NSYSU) in 2015.

Political career
Wu is considered an ally of Chen Chu, and served as a deputy mayor of Kaohsiung while Chen was mayor. Wu was appointed minister of the Public Construction Commission in April 2016. In February 2017, Wu requested the Kinmen Bridge completion date to be moved to the end of 2019. He was appointed Minister of Transportation and Communications in July 2018. Wu resigned the position in December 2018.

References

Living people
Politicians of the Republic of China on Taiwan from Yunlin County
Taiwanese Ministers of Transportation and Communications
Deputy mayors of Kaohsiung
National Sun Yat-sen University alumni
Year of birth missing (living people)
National Kaohsiung University of Science and Technology alumni
Feng Chia University alumni